The North American section of the 2019 FIVB Volleyball Women's Challenger Cup qualification acts as qualifiers for the 2019 FIVB Volleyball Women's Challenger Cup, for national teams which are members of the North, Central America and Caribbean Volleyball Confederation (NORCECA). This tournament was held in Sportplex Beau-Chateau, Quebec, Canada. The eventual winner will earn the right to compete in the 2019 FIVB Volleyball Women's Challenger Cup.

Qualification
The participating teams are the host plus the top three ranked teams of Norceca not qualified to the FIVB Nations League as of January 1, 2019.

Qualified teams
4 NORCECA national teams entered qualification by FIVB Rankings.
  (18) (Host)
  (13)
  (21)
  (25)

Pool standing procedure
 Number of matches won
 Match points
 Sets ratio
 Points ratio
 Result of the last match between the tied teams

Match won 3–0: 5 match points for the winner, 0 match points for the loser
Match won 3–1: 4 match points for the winner, 1 match point for the loser
Match won 3–2: 3 match points for the winner, 2 match points for the loser

Round robin
Venue:  Sportplex Beau-Chateau, Châteauguay, Quebec, Canada
All times are Eastern Time Zone (UTC−04:00).

References

External links
 Results

2019 FIVB Volleyball Women's Challenger Cup qualification
FIVB
2019 in Canadian sports
International volleyball competitions hosted by Canada
FIVB Volleyball Women's Challenger Cup qualification